Océane Babel (born 26 February 2004) is a French professional tennis player.

Babel started playing tennis at five years old after practicing on the Nintendo Wii. After joining the Sarcellois Tennis Club in Val d'Oise, she became France under-13 champion in 2017 and repeated the performance the following year in the under-14 category. She then moved to the National Training Center (CNE) of the Federation in September 2018 where she began to be coached by Noëlle van Lottum. Babel reached the quarterfinals of the girls' singles draw at the 2020 French Open in which she was defeated by Polina Kudermetova. Babel then won the opening Grade-A junior tournament of the 2021 season, in Criciúma, Brazil.

In May 2021, Babel was awarded a wildcard to enter the 2021 French Open women's singles, marking her debut at Grand Slam level.

Junior career

Grand Slam performance
Singles:
 Australian Open: –
 French Open: QF (2020)
 Wimbledon: 2R (2021)
 US Open: 2R (2021)

Doubles:
 Australian Open: –
 French Open: 2R (2020)
 Wimbledon: 1R (2021)
 US Open: 1R(2021)

ITF finals

Singles: 1 (runner-up)

Doubles: 7 (4 titles, 3 runner-ups)

References

External links
 
 

2004 births
Living people
French female tennis players
Tennis players from Paris